This is a list of Billboard magazine's top Hot 100 songs of 1961. The Top 100, as revealed in the edition of Billboard dated January 6, 1962, is based on Hot 100 charts from the issue dates of January through November 1961.

See also
 1961 in music
 List of Billboard Hot 100 number-one singles of 1961
 List of Billboard Hot 100 top-ten singles in 1961

References

1961 record charts
Billboard charts